United States gubernatorial elections were held on November 2, 2004, in 11 states and two territories. There was no net gain in seats for either party, as Democrats picked up an open seat in Montana while defeating incumbent Craig Benson in New Hampshire, while Republicans defeated incumbent Joe Kernan in Indiana and won Missouri after Bob Holden lost in the primary. These elections coincided with the presidential election.

Election results

States

Territories

Closest races 
States where the margin of victory was under 1%:
 Washington, 0.005%
 Puerto Rico, 0.2%

States where the margin of victory was under 5%:
 New Hampshire, 2.1%
 Missouri, 3.0%
 Montana, 4.4%

States where the margin of victory was under 10%:
 Delaware, 5.1%
 Indiana, 7.7%

See also
2004 United States elections
2004 United States presidential election
2004 United States Senate elections
2004 United States House of Representatives elections

Notes